Wallace Roney (May 25, 1960 – March 31, 2020) was an American jazz (hard bop and post-bop) trumpeter. He has won 1 Grammy award and has two nominations.

Roney took lessons from Clark Terry and Dizzy Gillespie and studied with Miles Davis from 1985 until the latter's death in 1991.  Wallace credited Davis as having helped to challenge and shape his creative approach to life as well as being his music instructor, mentor, and friend; he was the only trumpet player Davis personally mentored.

Early life and education

Roney was born in Philadelphia. He attended Howard University and Berklee College of Music in Boston, Massachusetts, after graduating from the Duke Ellington School of the Arts of the D. C. Public Schools, where he studied trumpet with Langston Fitzgerald of the Baltimore Symphony Orchestra. Found to have perfect pitch at the age of four, Wallace began his musical and trumpet studies at Philadelphia's Settlement School of Music.

He studied with trumpeter Sigmund Hering of the Philadelphia Orchestra for three years. Hering regularly presented Wallace at recitals at the Settlement School, and with the Philadelphia Brass Ensemble, during his studies in Philadelphia.

Career 
When he entered the Duke Ellington School, Roney had already made his recording debut at age 15 with Nation and Haki R. Madhubuti, and at that time met, among others, Bill Hardman, Valery Ponomarev, Woody Shaw (who befriended him), Johnny Coles and Freddie Hubbard. He played with the Cedar Walton Quartet featuring Billy Higgins, Sam Jones, and Philly Joe Jones at 16 years of age with the encouragement of his high school teacher.

Roney attained distinction as a gifted local performer in the Washington, D.C area. In 1979 and 1980, Roney won the DownBeat Award for Best Young Jazz Musician of the Year, and in 1989 and 1990 the DownBeat Magazine's Critic's Poll for Best Trumpeter to Watch.

In 1983, while taking part in a tribute to Miles Davis at "The Bottom Line" in Manhattan, he met his idol. "He [Davis] asked me what kind of trumpet I had," Roney told Time magazine, "and I told him none. So he gave me one of his." In 1984 and 1985, he was forced to play in Latin dance and reception bands, as the New York clubs, once a prominent part of the jazz scene, had mostly disappeared. But in 1986, he received a pair of calls, in the same month, to tour with drummers Tony Williams and Art Blakey, after which Roney became one of the most in-demand trumpet players on the professional circuit.

In 1986, he succeeded Terence Blanchard in Blakey's Jazz Messengers. In the late 1980s and early 1990s, he was an integral part of Williams's quintet. In 1991, Roney played with Davis at the Montreux Jazz Festival. After Davis's death that year, Roney toured in memoriam with Davis alumni Wayne Shorter, Herbie Hancock, Ron Carter and Tony Williams and recorded an album, A Tribute to Miles, for which they won a Grammy Award.

Roney learned his craft directly from Miles Davis. Critics have taken Roney to task for sounding too similar to his idol. Roney recorded his debut album as a leader, Verses, on Muse Records in 1987. A number of albums on Muse, Warner Bros. Records and Concord Records/Stretch Records followed, and by the time he turned 40 in 2000 Roney had been documented on over 250 audio recordings. His album titles from the 2000s include Mystikal (2005) and Jazz (2007) on HighNote Records. His two most recent albums are A Place in Time (HighNote 2016) and Blue Dawn - Blue Nights (HighNote 2019), which features his nephew, drummer Kojo Roney.

Personal life
Wallace Roney was the son of Wallace Roney, U.S. Marshal and President of the American Federation of Government Employees Local 102, grandson of Philadelphia musician Roosevelt Sherman, and older brother of tenor and soprano saxophonist Antoine Roney. In 1995, Roney married pianist Geri Allen, with whom he had two daughters and a son. The marriage ended prior to Allen's death in 2017. The two artists collaborated on records on many occasions during the 1990s and 2000s, on records released under each artist's name.

Earlier in his life, Roney had been a resident of  Montclair, New Jersey.

Death
Wallace Roney died at the age of 59 on March 31, 2020, at St. Joseph's University Medical Center in Paterson, New Jersey. The cause was complications arising from COVID-19.

Movie credits
2001 - The Visit - Jordan Walker-Perlman - music arrangement
1996 - Love Jones - music arrangement

Discography

As leader/co-leader
 Verses (Muse, 1987) 
 Intuition (Muse, 1988)
 The Standard Bearer (Muse, 1989) – recorded in 1989
 Obsession (Muse, 1991) – recorded in 1990
 Seth Air (Muse, 1991)
 Munchin' (Muse, 1993) 
 Crunchin' (Muse, 1993)
 Mistérios (Warner Bros., 1994) – arranged and conducted by Gil Goldstein
 A Tribute to Miles (Qwest/Reprise/Warner Bros., 1994) with Herbie Hancock, Wayne Shorter, Tony Williams, Ron Carter
 The Wallace Roney Quintet (Warner Bros., 1996) – recorded in 1995
 Village (Warner Bros., 1997) – recorded in 1996
 No Room for Argument (Stretch, 2000) 
 No Job Too Big or Small (32 Jazz, 2003) – compilation of Muse recordings
 Prototype (HighNote, 2004)
 Mystikal (HighNote, 2005)
 Jazz (HighNote, 2007)
 If Only for One Night (HighNote, 2010) – recorded in 2009
 Home (HighNote, 2012) – recorded in 2010
 Understanding (HighNote, 2013) – recorded in 2012
 A Place in Time (HighNote, 2016)
 What's New (Nippon Crown, 2016) – recorded in 1989
 Blue Dawn-Blue Nights (HighNote, 2019) – recorded in 2018

As sideman

With Geri Allen
 Maroons (Blue Note, 1992)
 Eyes in the Back of Your Head (Blue Note, 1997) – recorded in 1995-96
 The Gathering (Verve, 1998)
 Timeless Portraits and Dreams (Telarc, 2006)

With Kenny Barron
 What If? (Enja, 1986)

With Cindy Blackman
 Arcane (Muse, 1988) – recorded in 1987
 Code Red (Muse, 1992) – recorded in 1990

With Art Blakey
 Killer Joe (Union Jazz, 1982) with George Kawaguchi – recorded in 1981
 Art Blakey And Jazz Messengers ("San Marco Cafe", Miami, FL, January 11, 1986) (Arco 3, 1990) – recorded in 1986
 Feeling Good (Delos, 1986)

With Samuel Blaser
 Early in the Mornin (OutNote Records, 2018) – recorded in 2017With Donald Brown Born to be Blue (Space Time, 2013)With Terri Lyne Carrington Jazz Is a Spirit (ACT, 2002)With Chick Corea Remembering Bud Powell (Stretch, 1997) – recorded in 1996
 The Musician (Concord Jazz, 2017)With Joey DeFrancesco Where Were You? (Columbia, 1990)With Miles Davis Miles & Quincy Live at Montreux (Warner Bros., 1993) also with Quincy Jones – recorded in 1991With Bill Evans Escape (Escapade Music, 1996)With Ricky Ford Interpretations (Muse, 1982)With Letizia Gambi Introducing Letizia Gambi (Jando Music|Via Veneto Jazz, 2012)With Kenny GarrettGarrett 5 (Paddle Wheel, 1989) - recorded in 1988With Dizzy Gillespie To Diz with Love (Telarc, 1992)With Vincent Herring Evidence (Landmark, 1991) – recorded in 1990
 Dawnbird (Landmark, 1993) – recorded in 1991-92
 Simple Pleasure (HighNote, 2001)With Helen Merrill Brownie-A Homage To Clifford Brown (Verve, 1994)With David Murray, Geri Allen, and Terri Lyne Carrington Perfection (Motéma, 2016)With Makoto Ozone Three Wishes (Verve, 1998)With Powerhouse In an Ambient Way (Chesky, 2015)With David Sanborn Inside (Elektra, 1999)With Jarmo Savolainen First Sight (Timeless, 1992)With James Spaulding Brilliant Corners (Muse, 1990) – recorded in 1988With Superblue Superblue 2 (Blue Note, 1990) – recorded in 1989With Joe Louis Walker Pasa Tiempo (Evidence Music, 2002)With Tony Williams'''
 Civilization (Blue Note, 1987) – recorded in 1986
 Angel Street (Blue Note, 1988)
 Native Heart (Blue Note, 1990) – recorded in 1989
 Tokyo Live'' (Blue Note, 1993) – recorded in 1992. 2CD.

References

External links
 
 Profile, AllAboutJazz.com
 Fulfilling the Promise
 Following in Miles Davis' Footsteps, npr.org
 Biography, enotes.com
 Wallace Roney Interview NAMM Oral History Library (2018)
 

1960 births
2020 deaths
Post-bop trumpeters
Hard bop trumpeters
Jazz musicians from New Jersey
Musicians from Philadelphia
American jazz trumpeters
American male trumpeters
American jazz composers
American male jazz composers
Berklee College of Music alumni
Howard University alumni
Grammy Award winners
The Jazz Messengers members
Muse Records artists
HighNote Records artists
Warner Records artists
African-American jazz musicians
People from Montclair, New Jersey
Jazz musicians from Pennsylvania
Superblue (band) members
Deaths from the COVID-19 pandemic in New Jersey
20th-century trumpeters
20th-century American musicians
20th-century American male musicians
21st-century trumpeters
21st-century American musicians
21st-century American male musicians
21st-century African-American musicians